Tukkilaiskisat (Tukkilaiset) is a traditional timber rafting competition in Finland. Originally tukkilaiset referred to log drivers.

Recent sites where Tukkilaiskisat took place are Ii (Raasakkakoski), Kuusamo (Käylä), Laukaa (Kuusaankoski), Ylitornio (Kattilakoski), Imatra (Tainionkoski), and Lieksa. The 2017 championship will be held in Torniojoki. Participants can be experienced or novices.

In popular culture 
 Koskenlaskijan Morsian, (1923 film) produced by Erkki Karus. 
 Laulu tulipunaisesta kukasta, (book) by Johannes Linnankoskis. 
 Tukkijoella, (book) by Teuvo Pakkalas 
Both books were also adapted into films.
 Me tulemme taas (2008 book) by Mauri Hast and Pekka lanko
 Tukkilaisen tulo ja lähtö (1996 book) by Hanna Snellman

References

Finnish culture
Forestry
Timber rafting